GKT School of Medical Education (abbreviated: GKT) is the medical school of King's College London. The school has campuses at three institutions, Guy's Hospital (Southwark), King's College Hospital (Denmark Hill) and St Thomas' Hospital (Lambeth) in London – with the initial of each hospital making up the acronymous name of the school. University Hospital Lewisham and Queen Elizabeth Hospital are also teaching hospitals for GKT School of Medical Education. The school in its current guise was formed following a merger with the United Medical and Dental Schools of Guy's and St Thomas' Hospitals on 1 August 1998.

The medical school has an annual intake of around 400 places on the standard MBBS Programme, 50 places on the Extended Medical Degree Programme (EMDP) and 23 places on the Graduate/Professional Entry Programme (GPEP), and an additional 2 places on the GPEP course for Maxillofacial (MaxFax) Entry. The intake numbers vary year to year. It receives more applications for medicine than any other UK medical school and as of 2016 applicants were required to sit the  University Clinical Aptitude Test.

The medical school is ranked 8th in the world, as adjudged by Times Higher Education (THE) in its World University Rankings 2015–2016 by subject (Clinical, Pre-clinical and Health Results), commenting that "...While the overall strength of these countries has dipped, some of their institutions have moved against the tide. One of these is King's College London, which makes its debut in the top 10 (eighth)." As to QS World University Rankings (Medicine) 2021, the school is ranked 17th globally. It was ranked 12th in the world for medicine by Times Higher Education in 2022.  It is currently ranked 10th worldwide by Times Higher Education 2023. is ranked as the 5th best medical school in the UK for clinical medicine by the  U.S. News & World Report. 

The School is home to the World's oldest Hospital Gazette, originally published as Guy's Hospital Gazette in 1872, which continues to run under the name GKT Gazette.

Name
The School was named the GKT School of Medicine between 1998 and 2005. However, due to confusion over the official name of the institute, especially with regards to research emerging from the university, it was rebranded as the King's College London School of Medicine and Dentistry at Guy's, King's College and St Thomas' Hospitals.

In 2015, to reflect the strong history of the multiple institutions that comprise the medical school, the School once again rebranded as the King's College London GKT School of Medical Education.

History

The hospitals associated with King's College London GKT School of Medical Education, i.e., Guy's Hospital, King's College Hospital and St Thomas' Hospital (hence the GKT name and abbreviation), are: "amongst the oldest hospitals in the world, having endured the Black Death, the plague, the War of the Roses, the Great Fire of London, the Blitz and over 60 years of NHS reforms.". University Hospital Lewisham and Queen Elizabeth Hospital, Woolwich, are also associated with King's College London GKT School of Medical Education.

Of the GKT School of Medical Education teaching hospitals, St Thomas' Hospital is the oldest and was founded in 1173 but whose roots can be traced to the establishment of St Mary Overie Priory in 1106. Thomas Guy, a governor of St Thomas', founded Guy's Hospital in 1721 as a place to treat 'incurables' discharged from St Thomas'.

St Thomas's Hospital Medical School was founded in 1550 and was sited across St Thomas' Hospital and Guy's Hospital. In 1769 it was decided that Guy's would teach mainly medical subjects, whereas St Thomas' would focus on surgery and the joint teaching institution was generally known as The Borough Hospitals.  However, a dispute between the two hospitals regarding the successor to Sir Astley Cooper resulted in Guy's Hospital establishing its own medical school in 1825. After this, students of surgeons attended operations at both hospitals until 1836. A riot between students of the two hospitals broke out in the operating theatre at St. Thomas's in 1836 which ended the arrangement. St Thomas's Hospital Medical School and Guy's Hospital Medical School were two of the oldest and most prestigious medical schools in the UK.

In 1982 the two medical schools decided to merge and formed the United Medical and Dental Schools of Guy's and St Thomas' Hospitals, more commonly known as UMDS. It was enlarged in 1983 when the Royal Dental Hospital of London School of Dental Surgery merged with Guy's Hospital Dental School, and again in 1985 with the addition of the Postgraduate Institute of Dermatology.

Initially students of UMDS were allocated to one of the two campuses, with most preclinical teaching and all clinical teaching being separate. With the intake of 1989, students ceased being allocated in this way, and teaching for all students was divided between the campuses and their peripheral hospitals.

Discussions between King's College London (which had trained medical students since it was established and founded its own hospital, King's College Hospital, in 1840) and UMDS regarding a further merger began in 1992. UMDS was subsequently absorbed into King's College London on 1 August 1998, forming the Guy's, King's and St Thomas' School of Medicine, more commonly known as GKT. In 2005, the entity was rebranded King's College London School of Medicine and Dentistry at Guy's, King's College and St Thomas' Hospitals, also known as KCLMS. However it is still widely known as GKT amongst current students, graduates and consultants who consider themselves affiliated to the hospitals rather than the university.

In 2005 the dental school became the Dental Institute and the remainder was renamed the King's College School of Medicine. The dean, Robert Lechler, oversees the running of both the Medical and Dental schools, as well as the School of Biomedical Sciences (all three were formerly regarded as GKT before the rebranding).

Before the start of the 2010/11 academic year, Physiotherapy became a part of the School of Medicine, having previously been run by the School of Biomedical and Health Sciences.

Hospitals
King's College London GKT School of Medical Education is associated with the following hospitals:
 Guy's Hospital
 St Thomas' Hospital
 King's College Hospital
 Maudsley Hospital
 University Hospital Lewisham
 Bethlem Royal Hospital
 Evelina London Children's Hospital

It is also associated with several peripheral hospitals around the South East of the UK, including Medway Maritime Hospital, William Harvey Hospital and Queen Elizabeth The Queen Mother Hospital. Students are required to spend at least part of their training at these peripheral locations.

Campuses

Guy's Campus 
Guy's Campus is situated close to London Bridge and the Shard on the South Bank of the River Thames. It holds New Hunt's House Library and building, Hodgkin Building and Wills' Library, Henriette Raphael House and Guy's Hospital.

St Thomas' Campus 

The St Thomas' Campus in the London Borough of Lambeth, facing the Houses of Parliament across the Thames, houses parts of the School of Medicine and the Dental Institute. The Florence Nightingale Museum is also located here. The museum is dedicated to Florence Nightingale, the founder of the Nightingale Training School of St Thomas' Hospital (now King's Florence Nightingale Faculty of Nursing and Midwifery). St Thomas' Hospital became part of King's College London School of Medicine in 1998. The St Thomas' Hospital and Campus were named after St Thomas Becket. The Department of Twin Research (TwinsUk), King's College London is located in St. Thomas' Hospital.

The nearest Underground station is Westminster.

Denmark Hill Campus 

Denmark Hill Campus is situated in south London near the borders of the London Borough of Lambeth and the London Borough of Southwark in Camberwell and is the only campus not situated on the River Thames. The campus consists of King's College Hospital, the Maudsley Hospital and the Institute of Psychiatry, Psychology and Neuroscience (IoPPN). In addition to the Institute of Psychiatry, Psychology and Neuroscience, parts of the Dental Institute and School of Medicine, and a large hall of residence, King's College Hall, are situated here. Other buildings include the campus library known as the Weston Education Centre (WEC), the James Black Centre, the Rayne Institute (haemato-oncology) and the Cicely Saunders Institute (palliative care), the world's first purpose-built institute for palliative care

The Maurice Wohl Clinical Neuroscience Institute was opened by the Princess Royal in 2015 at the Denmark Hill Campus. It is named after British philanthropist Maurice Wohl, who had a long association with King's and supported many medical projects.

The nearest Overground station is Denmark Hill.

Admissions

King's College London, generally in 2005, is the sixth-most difficult UK university to gain admission to the, as ranked as  Sunday Times. A freedom-of-information request in 2015 revealed that for every 1,764 applications that School of Medical Education received, only 39 offers were made thereby resulting in an offer rate of just 2.2%. For other subjects: Nursery & Midwifery, Physiotherapy and Clinical Dentistry also had one of the lowest offer rates of 14%, 16% and 17%, respectively.

Graduation

Also see Graduation Dress of King's College London

Graduation ceremonies for School of Medical Education are normally held in June or July (summer). During summer graduation, the graduation ceremonies are held in Southwark Cathedral; this is owing to St Thomas's Medical School roots that could be traced to St Mary Overie Priory. For those who happen to finish during January (winter), graduands could opt for attending the graduation ceremonies held in the Barbican Centre.

Research

The School's research excellence is recognised worldwide and the 2008 Research Assessment Exercise confirmed King's as one of the top two universities in the UK for health research strength. Around 70 percent of health science submissions from King's were ranked in the top six within the UK.

Currently, the School hosts six MRC Centres,

 MRC-Asthma UK Centre in Allergic Mechanisms of Asthma
 MRC Centre for Developmental Neurobiology
 MRC Centre for Neurodegenerative Research
 MRC Centre for Social Genetic and Developmental Psychiatry
 MRC Centre for Transplantation
 MRC-HPA Centre for Environment and Health (awarded in 2009 in collaboration with Imperial College London)
 MRC National Institute for Medical Research (MRC NIMR) including the MRC Biomedical NMR Centre (planned to move to the new Francis Crick Institute in 2015, a partnership between the MRC, Cancer Research UK, Imperial College London, King's College London, the Wellcome Trust and University College London)

The two MRC Centres in Transplantation and the Allergic Mechanisms of Asthma in 2008 alone were awarded 'Centre of Excellence' status by the British Heart Foundation with funding of £9 million and a £4 million Breakthrough Breast Cancer Unit was opened in 2009.

The School is also host to its own 'Centre of Medical Law and Ethics', the first of its kind in the UK, and in March 2009, the school was accredited as an Academic health science centre, one of only five in the UK.

Sports teams

Like other medical schools in the UK, GKT has its own sports teams which compete in various student sports leagues and tournaments.

Like most other universities in London GKT sports teams take part in the BUCS leagues and cups and the University of London Union leagues and cups.  The GKT teams also take part in the United Hospitals Cup, which is a sporting competition played between the medical, dental and veterinary schools of London in all sports. The two most popular and biggest of the competitions include the United Hospitals Bumps (rowing) and the men's rugby.

GKT has a fierce sporting rivalry with King's College London. This rivalry led to the founding of the Macadam Cup in 2004, which pits GKT and KCL sports teams against each other. The championship is named in honour of Sir Ivison Macadam, an alumnus of King's. So far in Macadam Cup's history, the GKT Team has the most wins.

Notable alumni, academics and staff

 Recep Akdağ, Turkish Health Minister
 Eric Anson, New Zealand's first specialist anaesthetist
 Thomas Armitage, British physician and founder of the Royal National Institute of Blind People
 William Bowman, ophthalmic surgeon, helped found Ophthalmological Society of the United Kingdom
 Sir James Black, Nobel Prize laureate for Medicine in 1988 for work leading to the development of propranolol and cimetidine
 William Bowman, ophthalmic surgeon, helped found Ophthalmological Society of the United Kingdom
 Richard Bright, discoverer of Bright's disease
 Russell Brock, Baron Brock, pioneering cardiothoracic surgeon
 Sir Astley Cooper, discoverer of the Cooper's ligaments of the breasts
 John Leonard Dawson, Serjeant Surgeon to the Royal Household of the United Kingdom
 Richard Doll, epidemiologist and physiologist; established link between smoking and cancer
 Havelock Ellis, physician, sexual psychologist and social reformer
 Reita Faria, Indian model and Miss World 1966
 William Fergusson, surgeon who introduced the practice of conservative amputation
 David Ferrier, pioneering experimental neurologist
 Abraham Pineo Gesner, surgeon and inventor of kerosene refining
 John Hilton, great anatomist and surgeon
 Thomas Hodgkin, discoverer of Hodgkin's lymphoma
 Sir Frederick Hopkins, discoverer of vitamins
 Takaki Kanehiro, Japanese naval doctor, first person to discover the link between beriberi and diet
 John Keats, writer
 Joseph Lister, pioneer of aseptic surgery
 W. Somerset Maugham, playwright, novelist, short story writer
 Alex Mowat, professor of paediatric hepatology
 Humphry Osmond, psychiatrist who worked with psychedelic drugs and coined the term
 David Owen, Labour Foreign Secretary and founder of the Social Democratic Party
 Sir Alfred Poland, the first to describe Poland syndrome
 Sir Andrew Pollard, Chief Investigator on the Oxford–AstraZeneca COVID-19 vaccine
 Dame Cecily Saunders, nurse, physician and social worker who developed the concept of the hospice and was a pioneer of palliative care
 Audrey Smith, cryobiologist who discovered the use of glycerol to protect human red blood cells during freezing
 Jeffrey Tate, conductor
 Max Theiler, virologist, awarded the 1951 Nobel Prize in Physiology or Medicine for developing a vaccine for yellow fever
 Sheo Bhagwan Tibrewal, Orthopedic surgeon and Padma Shri awardee
 Robert Bentley Todd, known for discovering and describing the condition postictal paralysis now known as Todd's palsy
 Gerard Folliott Vaughan, UK psychiatrist, who became a politician and minister of state during Margaret Thatcher's government
 Sir Samuel Wilks, pathologist
 Claire Windsor, wife of the Earl of Ulster and physician by profession
 Fiona Wood AM, plastic surgeon, Australian of the Year 2005

References

External links
King's College London School of Medicine
GKT Medical Students' Association (MSA)
King's College London School of Medicine student lists
King's College London School of Medicine military personnel,1914–1918

 
Medicine and Dentistry
Dental schools in England
Medical schools in London
United Hospitals
1998 establishments in England